Ángel Mariscal Beuba  (17 August 1904 — 20 March 1979) was a Spanish footballer. He competed in the men's tournament at the 1928 Summer Olympics.

References

External links
 
 

1904 births
1979 deaths
Spanish footballers
Spain international footballers
Olympic footballers of Spain
Footballers at the 1928 Summer Olympics
Footballers from San Sebastián
Association football forwards
Real Sociedad footballers